The BaKonzo (pl. Bakonzo, sing. Mukonzo), or Konzo, are a Bantu ethnic group located in the Rwenzori region of Southwest Uganda in districts that include; Kasese,  Bundibugyo, Bunyangabu and Ntoroko districts. 

The Bankonzo are also known as the Bayiira or Banande or Abanyarwenzururu and they are composed of 14 Clans and different totems. (Ebihanda 14 ebyaba’yiira n’emitsiro). 

They speak the Konjo language and practice traditional religions, Islam and Christianity. Konzo speakers also live on the Western slopes of the Rwenzori range in the Democratic Republic of the Congo.

Numbering 850,646 in the 2014 census, they live on the plains, hills and mountain sloping up to an altitude of 2,200 meters in the Rwenzori Mountains. Traditionally agriculturalists and animal husbanders, they farm yams, beans, sweet potatoes, peanuts, soy beans, potatoes, rice, wheat, cassava, coffee, bananas, and cotton, while keeping goats, sheep, and poultry.

History 
The Konzo were part of the armed Rwenzururu movement against the Toro Kingdom and central government that reached heights in the mid-1960s and early 1980s.  In 2008, the government recognized the Rwenzururu Kingdom, formed by the Konjo and Amba peoples, as Uganda's first kingdom shared by two tribes.

Since July 2014, secessionist ambitions have led to armed clashes in which dozens have died.  Rwenzururu kingdom has witnessed episodes of bloodshed the recent notable one being that of November 2016; a conflict between the government of the repulic of Uganda and the Rwenzururu kingdom. This conflict saw the death of hundreds of people and others arrested including the king His Majesty Charles Mumbere and his then prime minister Thembo Kistumbire. 

Notable Bakonjo include Amon Bazira, a political figure instrumental in the negotiations that ended the 1980s conflict, and Charles Mumbere, named the Omusinga (king), of the Rwenzururu Kingdom. A very known Mukonzo is also Musa Baluku the leader of the ISCAP (Islamic State - Central Africa Province).

Origin 
Legend has it that the Bakonzo once lived on Mount Elgon in Eastern Uganda and that during the Kintu migrations, the Bakonzo came with Kintu to Buganda. However, rather than settle in Buganda, the Bakonzo are said to have decided to continue until they finally settled on the western highlands of Mt. Rwenzori which had a similar climate to that of Mt. Elgon where they had originally lived. This is said to have been around A.D. 1300. 

Another tradition asserts that the Bakonzi have lived on Mount Rwenzori from time immemorial and that they have no foreign place of origin. This tradition asserts that the ancestor of the Bakonzo emerged from one of the caves of Mount Rwenxori and produced the rest of the Bakonzo.

Writing system

Children Naming 
The Bakonzo name their children according to the precedence of birth where by each surname indicates someone's birth rank or birth order that is whether the child is the first born, second born up to the last born. The boys have eight names whereas the girls have eight names.

Male given names 

 A first born is named Baluku or Mutoha, and Nzeruku when some of the grandparents on either side of the parents are dead. However, if both the paternal and maternal grandparents are still alive by the time a boy child is born, he is named Mumbere or Kambere or Kasoke.
 A second born is named Bwambale (Mbaju as its short form) or Kambasu or Kambale
 A third born is named Masereka or Marahi or Maate or Kabuhyahya  are the short forms.
 A fourth born is named Kuule also missplessed as Kule.
 A fifth born is named Thembo or Kathembo.
 A sixth born is named Mbusa or Kabusa.
 A seventh born is named Tsongo.  
 A eight born is named Ndungu, and he is also expected to be the last boy.
 However, any child born after Ndungu, he is given any other name of choice.

Female given names

 The first born baby girl is named Masika. However, the first-born baby girl may be named Musoki if both the paternal and maternal grandparents are still alive by the time a child is born.
 The second born  named is Biira or Kabiira (where the "ka" stands for small, meaning Kabiira stands for "small Biira")
 The third born is named Kabugho or Kaswera.
 The fourth born is named Mbambu or Kahambu (where the "ka" stands for small). or Kapambu
 The fifth born is named Ithungu or Kathungu 
 The sixth born is named Kyakimwa.
 The seventh born is named Nziabake also misspelled as Nzyabake
The eight female child can also be named Kalibanda or Kathya.

Twins (Abahasa) given names 
 The elder twin is named Nguru while the other is Ndobya regardless of the sex.
 If both twins are male, the elder twin can be named Isingoma and the young one can be named Kato.
 If both twins are female, the elder twin  can be Nyangoma and the young twin is name Nyakato.
 Children born after twins are named Kitsa (also written as Kiiza), followed by Kamalha then followed by Karumba or Kibaba then followed by Nzangura regardless of the sex.
 If a mother gives birth to both male and female, the elder twin if a male is named either Nguru or Isingoma and the female is name Nyakato or Ndobya.
 If a mother gives birth to both male and female and the first twin is a female, she is named either Nguru or Nyangoma and the male is name either Ndobya or Kato.
 Nyabahasa is the name given to the mother of twins.
 Isebahasa is the name given to the father of twins.

Other Bakonzo names 

 Muhindo or Kahindo is a name given to a male or female child when the parents have produced a different gender for the first time say from male(s) to female(s) or female(s) to male(s). 
 Mbindule is given to a baby girl when parents give birth to their first female child after giving birth to a male(s) first. 
 Kanyere is a name given to a female produced if both parents were virgins when they married. 
 Nzanzu is a name given to a male produced if both parents were virgins when they married. 
 Bethubanji is a name given to a first born child regardless of sex if both its grandparents alive at the same time their parents are also living.
 Akatsukulhu is a name given to a child who has two generational grandparents.
 Kibaya, Kyithi, Bisogho, Kamabu, Bityabitya or Bisiika/Kyirere are names given to a male child(ren) who have been born after the death of an elder child(ren).
 Mutsuba, Bisiika, Bighasaki (loosely translated as "you are useless compared to the dead one") and Kyabu (loosely translated as "dustbin") are names that may be given to a baby girl born after the death of an elder child(ren).
 Muthende is a name given to a child when boys had gone for a circumcision initiation ceremony.
 Byerire is a name for child born during time of great harvest.
 Other names translated from other languages such as Runyankole include; Lwanzu from Rukundo (a Runyankole word meaning Love), Athwanzire from Natukunda (a Runyankole word meaning "He loves Us") and Apipawe from Ahimbisibwe  (a Runyankole word meaning "He should be praised")
 Sibendire which is translated as ‘they don’t want him’”.
 Baswekire which is translated as ‘people mock you’ 
 Balinandi which is translated as ‘on whose side are they’ a name that is given to children whose mothers had been mocked for infertility

More about Bankonzo naming: 

 The names Musoki and Mumbere are given to children when their parents are officially married.
 Events such as locust attacks, massacres and death also attract some names. For the Bakonzo, the completeness of life is embodied in the acceptance of death. The Bakonzo take the dead as more superior than the living, thus a child born after a deceased child is viewed as inferior.
 Nzyabake and Balhubasa are now very uncommon names because these days there are not many women who give birth to six or seven daughters.
 Whereas all ordinal names are prescriptive (root words with no explanation), Nzyabake, Balhubasa and Kithawithelina are descriptive adjectives. Nzyabake loosely means "I have few left" while Balhubasa means "in plenty".
 There is likelihood of having two Baluku(s) or Bwambale(s) in a polygamous families because every mother has a first born or second born.
 Male children can be given female children names.

Clans and their totems 
The Bankonzo are also known as the Bayiira or Banande or Abanyarwenzururu and they have 14 Clans and different totems. (Ebihanda 14 ebyaba’yiira n’emitsiro). 

The clans have to protect their totems as in they are not allowed to harm, kill or eat their totems.

Each of the Bakonzo clan has another Bankonzo clan which they regard as their "fake enemy". For example the Bakira's "fake enemy" are the Bahira clan.

See also 

 Rwenzururu
 Buganda Kingdom
 Baganda

References 

Ethnic groups in the Democratic Republic of the Congo
Ethnic groups in Uganda
Rwenzori Mountains